Henry Nodle Butler (born February 16, 1954) is an American professor of law, economics, and public policy and former executive director of the Law and Economics Center at the Antonin Scalia Law School in Arlington, Virginia.

Butler formerly served as the director of the Judicial Education Program at the American Enterprise Institute-Brookings Institution Joint Center for Regulatory Studies. A conservative, he supports free markets with little regulation. He has acted as an expert witness in a legal cases involving antitrust, restrictive covenants, damages, joint ventures, and other issues.

Butler ran unsuccessfully as a Republican for the U.S. House of Representatives for Virginia's 11th congressional district in  1992; he lost the general election to Democrat Leslie L. Byrne.

Early life and education
Butler is the son of M. Caldwell Butler, who served as a Republican U.S. Representative for Virginia's 6th congressional district from 1972 to 1983.

Butler received his Bachelor of Arts degree in economics from the University of Richmond in 1977. He then attended Virginia Tech, where he earned a Master of Arts in 1979 and a Ph.D. in 1982. There he studied under James M. Buchanan, a Nobel Economics Laureate.

Butler received a Juris Doctor from the University of Miami School of Law in 1982, where he was a John M. Olin Fellow in Law and Economics.

Career
Butler spent three years at Texas A&M University as an assistant professor of management before becoming a John M. Olin Fellow in Law and Economics at the University of Chicago Law School during the 1985-86 academic year. From 1986 to 1993, Butler was a professor at George Mason University School of Law, renamed Antonin Scalia Law School. After 1992 Butler Fred C. and Mary R. Koch Distinguished Professor of Law and Economics at the University of Kansas School of Law and School of Business, and for a short time served as dean of the Chapman University, Argyros School of Business and Economics and chairman of the Chapman University Law and Organizational Economics Center before moving to Chapman in 2001.

Butler has been involved in the political and legal spheres. While at George Mason University, he served as director of the Law and Economics Center at the George Mason University School of Law, which operates the Economics Institutes program for federal judges. In December 1995, Butler introduced the Economics Institute for State Judges at the University of Kansas' Law and Organizational Economics Center.

Butler has written extensively on law and economics. He has written a casebook, Economic Analysis for Lawyers (with Christopher Drahozal, Carolina Academic Press), used at the Economics Institute for State Judges. Other books by Butler include Unhealthy Alliances: Bureaucrats, Interest Groups, and Politicians in Health (1994, American Entreprise Institute) The Corporation and the Constitution (with Larry E. Ribstein; 1995, American Entreprise Institute); and Using Federalism to Improve Environmental Policy (with Jonathan R. Macey; 1996, American Enterprise Institute).

Butler serves on the Legal Advisory Council of the AEI Legal Center for the Public Interest and the Advisory Board of the Atlantic Legal Foundation.

References

External links

Profile from the Atlantic Legal Foundation
Profile from Northwestern University School of Law
Entry on the Political Graveyard
Report of Henry N. Butler to the Kansas Insurance Commissioner
Website at George Mason University

1954 births
Living people
People from Roanoke, Virginia
21st-century American economists
American lawyers
American legal writers
American legal scholars
Deans of law schools in the United States
University of Richmond alumni
Virginia Tech alumni
University of Miami School of Law alumni
University of Chicago Law School faculty
George Mason University School of Law faculty
Chapman University faculty
Virginia Republicans
Texas Republicans
Kansas Republicans
Illinois Republicans